HMS Vivacious (D36) was a V-class destroyer of the British Royal Navy that saw service in World War I and World War II.

Construction and commissioning 
Vivacious, the first Royal Navy ship of the name, was ordered on 30 June 1916 as part of the 9th Order of the 1916–17 Naval Programme. She was laid down in July 1916 by Yarrow Shipbuilders of Glasgow, Scotland, and launched on 3 November 1917. She was completed in December 1917 and commissioned on 29 December 1917.

Service history

World War I and interwar years 
Upon completion, Vivacious was fitted for use as a minelayer and entered service with the fleet during the final year of World War I. After the war, she deployed to the Baltic Sea in 1919 to participate in the British campaign there against Bolshevik forces during the Russian Civil War, seeing action against Russian warships. She later served in the Atlantic Fleet and the Mediterranean Fleet until decommissioned and placed in reserve at Rosyth Scotland, in the mid-1930s.

In August 1939, Vivacious was recommissioned with a reserve crew for the review of the Reserve Fleet by King George VI at Weymouth.

World War II

1939–1941 
Vivacious remained in commission after the United Kingdom entered World War II in September 1939, Assigned to the 17th Destroyer Flotilla at Plymouth for convoy escort and patrol duties in the English Channel and the Southwestern Approaches, she escorted an 18-ship convoy carrying supplies, ammunition, and vehicles for the British Expeditionary Force from the United Kingdom to Cherbourg, France, on 10 September 1939. From 15 to 16 December 1939 she provided escort for Convoy HG 10 during a portion of its passage from Gibraltar to Liverpool.

After arriving at Liverpool on 15 April 1940, Vivacious remained based there.

On 12 May 1940, as German forces conquered the Netherlands, Vivacious and the destroyer  escorted the destroyer  as Codrington transported the Dutch Royal Family from the Hook of Holland into exile in the United Kingdom in Operation J.

She began patrols the following day to protect the evacuation beachhead from attacks by German aircraft and motor torpedo boats (S-boats, known to the Allies as "E-boats"). She made two trips from Dunkirk to Dover on 28 May 1940, evacuating 326 men on the first one and 359 on the second, and on 30 May 1940 she carried 537 more men from Dunkirk to Dover. German howitzers ashore fired on her on 31 May 1940 while she was off Bray-Dunes, France, inflicting 15 casualties on her crew. She took 427 more men from Dunkirk to Dover on 1 June 1940. She also took part in Operation OK on 3 June 1940, in which blockships were sunk to block the harbor at Dunkirk; she took aboard the crews of the sunken ships and brought them to Dover. One of those rescued from Dunkirk was the Rev Ivan Neill who would later become the Chaplain General.

After the evacuation was complete, Vivacious was transferred to the 21st Destroyer Flotilla at Sheerness on 7 June 1940 for convoy escort and anti-invasion patrol duty in the North Sea. While escorting Convoy FN 288 from Southend to Methil on 22 September 1940, a mine detonated near her, causing damage that was not fully repaired until mid-1941. In 1941, after the threat of invasion subsided, she began to participate in the interception of German S-boats in the North Sea to prevent them from attacking convoys in addition to her other duties.

The Channel Dash, 1942 
The Royal Navy and Royal Air Force had virtually no forces available to oppose them, so the Admiralty ordered the six destroyers to abort their exercises and make torpedo attacks against the German heavy ships. Vivacious was the first to attack and did not suffer any major damage or casualties despite the heavy escort and air cover the Germans had provided for the passage, but the attacks were unsuccessful and the German ships succeeded in making port in Germany.

1942–1945 
After the Channel Dash, Vivacious returned to her normal North Sea duties. She was "adopted" by the civil community of Solihull, then in Warwickshire, in March 1942 in a Warship Week National Savings campaign, and she collided with the destroyer  on 31 August 1942. In January 1943, she was chosen for detached duty with the Home Fleet to assist in the defense of Arctic convoys steaming to and from the Soviet Union. On 5 February 1943 she and the escort destroyers  and  deployed to provide local escort for Convoy RA 52 during the final leg of its voyage from the Soviet Union. She returned to the 21st Destroyer Flotilla and her North Sea duties in April 1943.

The following day, she took part in escorting Convoys ETM 33 and ETM 3W to the beachhead, then returned to the Nore. She continued convoy protection duties related to the invasion until released from Operation Neptune toward the end of June 1944.

In July 1944, Vivacious returned to the 21st Destroyer Flotilla and convoy escort and patrol duties in the North Sea and English Channel, continuing them until the surrender of Germany in early May 1945. After that she operated in support of reoccupation forces and on 15 May 1945, joined the destroyer  in escorting minesweepers during minesweeping operations at Bergen, Norway.

Decommissioning and disposal 
Vivacious was decommissioned during the summer of 1945 – she was no longer carried on the Royal Navys active list as of July 1945 – and was in reserve until placed on the disposal list in 1947. She was sold on 17 May 1947 to BISCO for scrapping by Metal Industries and arrived at the shipbreakers yard on 10 September 1948.

Notes

Bibliography

External links 
 Naval History: HMS VIVACIOUS (D 36) –  V & W-class Destroyer
 uboat.net HMS Vivacious (D 36)

25918018708465

V and W-class destroyers of the Royal Navy
Ships built on the River Clyde
1917 ships
World War I destroyers of the United Kingdom
World War II destroyers of the United Kingdom
Maritime incidents in August 1942